Simone Impellizzeri (died August 1701) was a Roman Catholic bishop who served as Prelate of Santa Lucia del Mela (1670–1701).

Biography
On 29 July 1670, Simone Impellizzeri was appointed by Pope Clement X as Bishop of the Territorial Prelature of Santa Lucia del Mela. He served as Prelate of Santa Lucia del Mela until his death in August 1701.

References

External links and additional sources
 (for Chronology of Bishops) 
 (for Chronology of Bishops) 

1701 deaths
17th-century Roman Catholic bishops in Sicily
Bishops appointed by Pope Clement X